The Chilean skua, also called the cinnamon skua (Stercorarius chilensis), is a large predatory seabird, which breeds in Argentina and Chile, but ranges as far north as Brazil and Peru when not breeding. A relatively distinctive skua, it has a dark cap that contrasts with its cinnamon throat and lower face. Hybrids with the brown skua are known from southern Argentina.

While nowhere near the size of birds such as the wandering albatross, the Chilean skua makes up for it in sheer aggression towards other birds.

Chilean skuas feed on fish and other seabirds, as well as scraps, and carrion.

Notes
  Avibase - the world bird database

References 

Skuas
Birds of Chile
Birds of Patagonia
Birds described in 1857
Taxa named by Charles Lucien Bonaparte
Taxobox binomials not recognized by IUCN